Roger William Gries, OSB (born March 26, 1937) is an American prelate of the Roman Catholic Church.  He is one of a few monastic priests to be named a bishop.

Gries served as an auxiliary bishop of the Diocese of Cleveland in Ohio from 2001 to 2013.  Previously, Gries was abbot of St. Andrew Abbey in Cleveland from 1981 to 2001.

Biography

Early life 
Roger Gries was born on March 26, 1937, in Cleveland to John and Dorothy (Soukup) Gries. He attended Benedictine High School in Cleveland, where he captained the football team. On July 11, 1957, Gries professed to the Order of St. Benedict, entering St. Andrew Abbey in Cleveland.

Priesthood 
Gries was ordained a priest by Bishop Clarence Edward Elwell on May 18, 1963 to the Order of St. Benedict. Following his ordination, Gries attended Loyola University Chicago, where he earned Bachelor of Education and Master of Education degrees. In 1964, he was assigned to Benedictine High School in Cleveland, serving there until 2001 as a teacher, coach, bus driver, principal and president.

On June 9, 1981, Gries was elected and confirmed as abbot of St. Andrew Abbey.  He was blessed in August, 1981.  Gries served as abbot for the next 20 years.

Auxiliary Bishop of Cleveland 
On March 25, 2001, Pope John Paul II named Gries as titular bishop of Praesidium and as an auxiliary bishop of the Diocese of Cleveland.  He was consecrated by Bishop Anthony Pilla on June 7, 2001. with Auxiliary Bishops James Quinn and Anthony Pevec as the principal co-consecrators.

Resignation 
Gries's letter of resignation as auxiliary bishop of the Archdiocese of Cleveland was accepted by Pope Francis on Friday, November 1, 2013.

After his retirement, Gries performed confirmations, jubilees, funerals, and other celebrations and would visit inner city schools in Cleveland for mass and other activities.

See also
 

 Catholic Church hierarchy
 Catholic Church in the United States
 Historical list of the Catholic bishops of the United States
 List of Catholic bishops of the United States
 Lists of patriarchs, archbishops, and bishops

References

External links

 Roman Catholic Diocese of Cleveland Official Site

Episcopal succession

Living people
1937 births
Religious leaders from Cleveland
Loyola University Chicago alumni
American Benedictines
Benedictine abbots
Benedictine bishops
Roman Catholic Diocese of Cleveland
21st-century American Roman Catholic titular bishops